Howes is an unincorporated community in Dent County, in the U.S. state of Missouri. The community is on Missouri Route 19 approximately 4.5 miles north of Salem.

History
The community was named after the local Howe family. A variant name was Gano. An early postmaster named Gano gave his last name to the post office, in order to avoid repetition with nearby Howes Mill. A post office called Gano was established in 1902, and remained in operation until 1923.

References

Unincorporated communities in Dent County, Missouri
Unincorporated communities in Missouri